The Office of the Chief Scientist (OCS) is part of the Department of Industry, Science and Resources.  Its primary responsibilities are to enable growth and productivity for globally competitive industries. To help realise this vision, the Department has four key objectives: supporting science and commercialisation, growing business investment and improving business capability, streamlining regulation and building a high performance organisation.

Chief Scientist
The Chief Scientist is responsible for advising the Government of Australia on scientific and technological issues.

The Chief Scientist chairs the Research Quality Framework Development Advisory Group, the National Research Priorities Standing Committee and is a member of other key Government committees: 
 Coordination Committee on Science and Technology
 Prime Minister's Science Prizes Committee
 Cooperative Research Centres Committee
 Publicly Funded Research Agencies Committee
 Commonwealth, State and Territory Advisory Council on Innovation
 National Collaborative Research Infrastructure Strategy Committee

Chief Scientists
 1989–1992: Ralph Slatyer
 1992–1996 : Michael Pitman
 1996–1999: John Stocker, part-time
 1999–2005 : Robin Batterham, part-time
 2006–2008: Jim Peacock, part-time
 2008–2011: Penny Sackett, full-time
 2011–2016: Ian Chubb 
 2016–2020: Alan Finkel
2021–present: Cathy Foley

National Science and Technology Council
The National Science and Technology Council is responsible for providing advice to the Prime Minister and other Ministers on important science and technology issues facing Australia.

The Prime Minister Scott Morrison and Minister for Industry, Science and Technology, the Hon Karen Andrews MP, announced the new Council on 28 November 2018

The Council is Chaired by the Prime Minister, with the Minister for Industry, Science and Technology as Deputy Chair. Australia’s Chief Scientist, Dr Alan Finkel, is the Executive Officer.

History of Australian science councils
 Australian Science, Technology and Engineering Council (1977–1997)
 Prime Minister's Science, Engineering and Innovation Council (1997–2013)
 Commonwealth Science Council (2014–2018)
 National Science and Technology Advisory Council (2018–present)

See also
 Backing Australia's Ability

References

External links
 

Commonwealth Government agencies of Australia
Scientific organisations based in Australia
 
Australia